Jérôme Galon is a French biologist. He is first class Research Director (DR1) at Institut National de la Santé et de la Recherche Médicale (INSERM).

Education
Galon received his Ph.D. degree (Doctorat ès science) with specialty in immunology in 1996. and did postdoctoral work  at the National Institute of Health (NIH), in Bethesda (USA) between 1997 and 2001. Since 2001, he has been working at the Cordeliers Research Center, where he has been the Director  of the INSERM Laboratory Integrative Cancer Immunology since 2009.

Scientific contributions
His work aims at a better understanding of the tumor microenvironment and the dynamics of the immune response in humans tumors.   His laboratory has identified and demonstrated the importance of the immune contexture against cancer. He defined the Immunoscore as a new method for routine clinical assessment of prognosis of patients with cancer.

Awards and recognition

 NIH Excellence Research Award (1999)
 Prix Shaeverbeke from Fondation de France (2008)
 Prix Rose Lamarca from Fondation pour la recherche médicale (2008)
 William B. Coley Award of the Cancer Research Institute (2010)
 Prix Simone et Cino Del Duca from the French Academy of Sciences Académie des sciences (2011)
 Prix Gallet et Breton from the French Academy of Medicine Académie de médecine (2011)
 European Inventor Award (2019)
 Louis-Jeantet Prize (2021)

References

External links
Laboratory of Integrative Cancer Immunology homepage
Official CV at Laboratory of Integrative Cancer Immunology 
 

1967 births
Living people
French biologists
Scientists from Besançon